So Fresh - The Hits of Spring 2009 is a compilation of hit songs in Australia from Spring 2009. The album was released on 11 September 2009.

Track listing

CD
  The Black Eyed Peas – "I Gotta Feeling" (4:50)
  Kate Miller-Heidke – "The Last Day on Earth" (4:47)
  Guy Sebastian – "Like It Like That" (3:50)
  Lady Gaga – "Paparazzi" (3:29)
  Jordin Sparks – "Battlefield" (4:01)
  Gossip – "Heavy Cross" (4:04)
  Taylor Swift – "You Belong with Me" (3:52)
  Pink – "Funhouse" (3:25)
  Kelly Clarkson – "Already Gone" (4:41)
  Short Stack – "Sway, Sway Baby!" (2:51)
  The Pussycat Dolls – "Hush Hush; Hush Hush" (4:12)
  Cascada – "Evacuate the Dancefloor" (3:26)
  Dizzee Rascal and Armand Van Helden – "Bonkers" (2:57)
  Pitbull – "I Know You Want Me (Calle Ocho)" (3:04)
  La Roux – "In for the Kill" (4:09)
  Paloma Faith – "Stone Cold Sober" (2:55)
  Jessica Mauboy – "Up/Down" (3:26)
  Calvin Harris – "I'm Not Alone" (3:31)
  Cassie Davis – "Do It Again" (2:52)
  Tommy Trash – "Need Me to Stay" (3:38)

DVD

  The Black Eyed Peas – "I Gotta Feeling"
  Lady Gaga – "Paparazzi"
  Jordin Sparks – "Battlefield"
  Gossip – "Heavy Cross"
  Taylor Swift – "You Belong with Me"
  Guy Sebastian – "Like It Like That"
  Kate Miller-Heidke – "The Last Day on Earth"
  Pink – "Funhouse"
  Kelly Clarkson – "Already Gone"
  Short Stack – "Sway, Sway Baby!"
  The Pussycat Dolls – "Hush Hush; Hush Hush"
  Cascada – "Evacuate the Dancefloor"

Charts

Year-end charts

Certifications

References 

2009 compilation albums
So Fresh albums
2009 in Australian music